John Franklin Spellman (June 14, 1899 – August 1, 1966) was an American wrestler and Olympic champion. He competed at the 1924 Olympic Games in Paris, where he won a gold medal in the freestyle light heavyweight division. After college, Spellman became a professional wrestler and football player. Spellman played American football as a right end for the Providence Steam Roller and Boston Braves from 1925 to 1932.

References

1899 births
1966 deaths
Wrestlers at the 1924 Summer Olympics
American male sport wrestlers
Olympic gold medalists for the United States in wrestling
Medalists at the 1924 Summer Olympics
Sportspeople from Middletown, Connecticut
American football ends
Brown Bears football players
Providence Steam Roller players
Boston Braves (NFL) players
Players of American football from Connecticut
American male professional wrestlers
American emigrants to Rhodesia
Olympic wrestlers of the National Football League